Albert Ramos Viñolas was the defending champion, but lost in the quarterfinals to Fernando Verdasco.

David Ferrer won his third title in Båstad, defeating Alexandr Dolgopolov in the final, 6–4, 6–4, ending a 21-month title drought.

Seeds
The top four seeds receive a bye into the second round.

Draw

Finals

Top half

Bottom half

Qualifying

Seeds

Qualifiers

Lucky loser
  Paul-Henri Mathieu

Qualifying draw

First qualifier

Second qualifier

Third qualifier

Fourth qualifier

External links
 Main draw
 Qualifying draw

Swedish Open - Singles
2017 Men's Singles